Peter Michael Byrne (5 March 1936 – 17 August 2017) was a Canadian sailor. He competed in the Flying Dutchman event at the 1972 Summer Olympics.

References

External links
 
 

1936 births
2017 deaths
Canadian male sailors (sport)
Olympic sailors of Canada
Sailors at the 1972 Summer Olympics – Flying Dutchman
Canadian people of Irish descent
People from Dún Laoghaire
Sportspeople from Dún Laoghaire–Rathdown